The oxalate phosphites are chemical compounds containing oxalate and phosphite anions.  They are also called oxalatophosphites or phosphite oxalates. Oxalate phosphates can form metal organic framework compounds.

Related compounds include the nitrite oxalates, arsenite oxalates, phosphate oxalates and oxalatophosphonates. 

The oxalate ion is rectangular and planar. The phosphite ion is shaped as a triangular pyramid. Because of high charge and stiff shape they will bridge across more than one cation, in particular those hard cations with a higher charge such as +3. Hydrogen can convert some of the oxygen on the anions to OH and reduce the charge. Many oxalate phosphite compounds have microporous structures where amines direct the structure formation.

List

References

Oxalates
Phosphites
Mixed anion compounds